Kelvinhaugh may refer to:

Kelvinhaugh, Glasgow, urban neighbourhood in Scotland
Kelvinhaugh, Queensland, locality in Australia